The 2010–11 Premier Soccer League season (known as the ABSA Premiership for sponsorship reasons) was the fifteenth since its establishment. Supersport United were the defending champions, having won their third premier league title the previous season. The campaign began on 27 August 2010 and ended on 21 May 2011. A total of 16 teams contested the league, 15 of which already contested in the 2009–10 season and one of which was promoted from the National First Division.

Orlando Pirates secured the title with a 2–1 win against Golden Arrows on 21 May 2011. This was their third PSL title. At the bottom, Mpumalanga Black Aces was relegated to the First Division while Vasco da Gama contested the relegation playoffs and failed to secure its premier league status.

Team information

Stadia and locations 
Some of the teams rotated between several home venues during the season.
The table below list the stadium mostly picked as home venue, for each team.
At the bottom of the table, a purple template show all home venues during the season.

Personnel and sponsoring

Managerial changes 
The table below, list all managerial changes happening In-season.

League table 

Black Leopards qualified for the 2012 CAF Confederation Cup as the 2010–11 Nedbank Cup runner-up.

Results

Statistics

Top goalscorers 
As of 21 May 2011

Last updated: 21 May 2011
Source: Premier Soccer League

See also 
 CAF 5 Year Ranking

References

External links 
Premier Soccer League (PSL) Official Website
ABSA Premiership
PSL Results
PSL Standings
SA Premiership 2010–2011 Season Domestic Stats

SOut
1
2010–11